Alugolla is a village in Sri Lanka. It is located northwest of Menikdiwela, within Kandy District, Central Province.

Demographics

See also
List of towns in Central Province, Sri Lanka

External links

References

Populated places in Kandy District